Patrick Robert Powers (born February 13, 1958, in Los Angeles, California) is a former volleyball player from the United States. Powers was a member of the American Men's National Team that won the gold medal at the 1984 Summer Olympics.

Powers, who prepped at Santa Monica High School, transferred to the University of Southern California after helping Santa Monica College win the 1977 state J.C. title. He lettered three years at USC (1978–80) as the Trojans won the 1980 NCAA title and were runners-up in 1979. He was a two-time All-American first teamer and NCAA All-Tournament team member (1979–80).

Powers is only one of three players in the world who has won an Indoor (1986) and Beach (1987) World Championship

Achievements 
- - - - - - - - - - - 
1978 - Pac-Rim Championship 
1980 - NCAA Champion 
1984 - Olympic Gold Medalist 
1985 - World Cup Gold Medalist 
1986 - World Championship Gold Medalist 
1987 - World Beach Volleyball Championship

See also
 USA Volleyball

References

1958 births
Living people
Powers, Pat (volleyball)
Volleyball players at the 1984 Summer Olympics
Olympic gold medalists for the United States in volleyball
Volleyball players from Los Angeles
Place of birth missing (living people)
USC Trojans men's volleyball players
Medalists at the 1984 Summer Olympics
Goodwill Games medalists in volleyball
Competitors at the 1986 Goodwill Games